BUFC is an abbreviation referring to one of the following football clubs:

 Backwell United F.C.
 Bali United F.C.
 Ballymena United F.C.
 Banbury United F.C.
 Bangalore United F.C.
 Bangkok United F.C.
 Basford United F.C.
 Basildon United F.C.
 Bay United F.C.
 Bedworth United F.C.
 Bexhill United F.C.
 Biggleswade United F.C.
 Birstall United F.C.
 Blandford United F.C.
 Bonagee United F.C.
 Boston United F.C.
 Brandon United F.C.
 Brightlingsea United F.C.
 Bulls United F.C.
 Buriram United F.C.